Victory Challenge was a Swedish yacht racing team that competed in 2003 America's Cup and 2007 America's Cup. The team was initiated in 1999 by Swedish businessman Jan Stenbeck, and after his death in August 2002, his son Hugo Stenbeck took over.

They also participated in the Louis Vuitton Cup 2007, the challenger selection series held prior to the 2007 America's Cup. It was sponsored primarily by Red Bull.

References

External links 
 

America's Cup teams
Sports teams in Sweden
2001 establishments in Sweden